Delta Rho Upsilon is a local fraternity at Carroll University in Waukesha, Wisconsin.

History
Harold Hamilton was the first president of the fraternity. It existed under this name for over 20 years until its Greek letters were adopted in the 1950s to avoid confusion between the University's mascot and other similarly-named student organizations. The Fraternity was also known as the Pioneer Fraternity in the 1940s. Delta Rho Upsilon has always been a social, or general fraternity. 

Fraternity members and alumni are called "D.R.'s" or "Delta Rho's". When the Little Sister organization existed its female auxiliary members were called "Little Sis's".

While Delta Rho Upsilon has been a local organization on the Carroll campus for over ninety years, briefly in the 1960s a second, Beta chapter was placed at the Milwaukee Institute of Technology; it was closed when that college transferred ownership to a two-year technical college called the Milwaukee Area Technology College.

The fraternity has resided in several houses on the Carroll University campus, some of which have been torn down due to the campus expansion; a former home at 124 McCall Street was long vacant while ownership was litigated beginning in 2001, and an eventual sale concluded in 2012.  

Today, a clubhouse for the Active Chapter/Alumni Association is maintained by the Fraternity at the corner of Hartwell Avenue and East Broadway Street, off campus.

Property litigation
Regarding the home at 124 McCall Street, Waukesha, it was designed and built on the site of two former properties by the fraternity's alumni association. The Fraternity first occupied the new building in the fall of 1974. In a 2002 lawsuit seeking title the alumni asserted they have maintained the property, and had paid all costs for mortgage, maintenance and upkeep.  Additionally, they asserted expenditures of "between $40,000-$50,000 on upgrades and improvements." The College had been the Fraternity's lien holder, which the Fraternity explains was a "convenience", under an agreement that when the property was paid off, the College would transfer title.  With the mortgage paid, the DRU Alumni Association asserted their demand for title, but this had not been provided; instead, the college offered a buyout in the amount of $138,000. A lawsuit was filed to adjudicate the matter, later resolved in the fraternity's favor.

With an eye on another building, in 2011 the alumni had determined to sell the 124 McCall property, which it now owned, but which had been cited by the City with complaints about deferred maintenance. These opened the door for unrelated claimants to attempt to seize the property, all of which were denied. A buyer was found, and the property sold late in 2011.

Traditions
Delta Rho Upsilon elects a Rose Queen each year in addition to holding a semi-formal and formal dance.

The current mascot is the Pink Panther.

References

See also

Carroll University Portal Page for Delta Rho Upsilon Fraternity
List of social fraternities and sororities

Local fraternities and sororities
Student organizations established in 1929
1929 establishments in Wisconsin